Timor Leste competed at the 2016 Asian Beach Games held in Danang, Vietnam from 24 September to 3 October 2016.

Competitors

2016 in East Timor
Nations at the 2016 Asian Beach Games